Nicola Silvestri (born 21 November 1985) is an Italian footballer.

Biography
Born in Gavardo, the Province of Brescia, Silvestri started his career with Brescia Calcio. In mid-2004, he left for Viterbese but the loan pre-matured in January 2005. In 2005–06 season, he left for Hungarian side Sopron, joining Giuseppe Signori and manager Dario Bonetti.

In July 2006 he was signed by Serie B club Genoa but was loaned to Serie C1 clubs Massese (along with Massimo Gazzoli) and Lanciano. In August 2008 he left for Serie B side Piacenza from Genoa, now a Serie A club on free transfer. However, he was loaned back to Lega Pro Prima Divisione (ex-Serie C1) for Lumezzane.

On 1 July 2009 he returned to Piacenza but only played 3 Serie B matches. He started his first Serie B match as central midfielder and partnered with Radja Nainggolan. However, he only collected 3 appearances in 2009–10 Serie B.

On 31 August 2011 he was signed by Prima Divisione club Triestina on free transfer. However, he was injured in October.

References

External links
 La Gazzetta dello Sport Profile 
 Football.it Profile 
 
 Piacenza Profile 

Italian footballers
Italian expatriate footballers
Serie B players
Brescia Calcio players
U.S. Viterbese 1908 players
FC Sopron players
Genoa C.F.C. players
U.S. Massese 1919 players
S.S. Virtus Lanciano 1924 players
Piacenza Calcio 1919 players
F.C. Lumezzane V.G.Z. A.S.D. players
U.S. Triestina Calcio 1918 players
Venezia F.C. players
F.C. Matera players
Association football midfielders
Sportspeople from the Province of Brescia
Expatriate footballers in Hungary
Italian expatriate sportspeople in Hungary
1985 births
Living people
Footballers from Lombardy